Masters of Horror is the soundtrack accompanying the television series Masters of Horror. Volume 1 sold over 50,000 copies.

Volume 1 Track listing

Volume 2 Track listing

References

2005 soundtrack albums
2006 soundtrack albums
Television soundtracks
Albums with cover art by Sons of Nero